is a hilly and mountainous area located at the north end of Kita-ku in Okayama City, Okayama Prefecture, Japan.

As of September 30, 2010, the area had an estimated population of 6,382  and a density of 71.28 persons per km². The total area was 89.53 km².

Takebe-chō was a town located in Mitsu District, Okayama Prefecture. But on January 22, 2007, Takebe, along with town of Seto (from Akaiwa District), was merged into the expanded city of Okayama.

Attraction
 Asahigawa Dam
 Birthplace of Takenouchi-ryū
 Buraku-ji Temple
 Great Okayama Golf Club
 Joju-ji Temple
 Shichisha Hachimangū Shrine
 Shiro Jinja Shrine
 Forest Golf Club (Takebenomori Golf Club)
 Takebe no Mori Park
 Yahata Hotsprings (Onsen)

Transportation

Train stations
 JR-West
 Tsuyama Line: Fukuwatari
 Tsuyama Line: Takebe

Major roads
 Route 53
 Route 484

References

Dissolved municipalities of Okayama Prefecture
Geography of Okayama Prefecture